Joseph Johann von Littrow (13 March 1781, Horšovský Týn – 30 November 1840, Vienna) was an Austrian astronomer. In 1837, he was ennobled with the title Joseph Johann Edler von Littrow. He was the father of Karl Ludwig Edler von Littrow and the mentor of the mathematician Nikolai Brashman. His work took him to Russia for a time, which is where his son who succeeded him was born.

He became director of the Vienna Observatory in 1819.  He served in this position until his death in 1840.  He created the only conformal retroazimuthal map projection, which is known as the Littrow projection. Littrow authored the widely read Wunder des Himmels ("Miracles of the Sky"), which was reprinted eight times by 1897.

Von Littrow is often associated with a proposal to dig a large circular canal in the Sahara desert and fill it with burning kerosene, thus communicating the fact of human intelligence to aliens who may be observing earth. However, Von Littrow's connection with this scheme may be apocryphal.

The crater Littrow on the Moon is named in his honor.

He is the great-great-great-grandfather of Roman Catholic Cardinal Christoph Schönborn.

Timeline 
 1799 Entered Charles University
 1802 Graduated in jurisprudence and theology
 1803 Became the private tutor of count J. Renard in Silesia
 1807 Appointed professor of astronomy Krakau University
 1810 Established the observatory at Kazan University
 1816 Became co-director of the observatory at Ofen (Buda)
 1819 Appointed professor of astronomy at the University of Vienna and became director of the first university observatory Vienna, which he reorganized completely

References

External links 

 Atlas des Gestirnten Himmels, published in Stuttgart in 1839. – Full digital facsimile, Linda Hall Library
  Atlas des gestirnten himmels, Stuttgart 1854 da www.atlascoelestis.com

19th-century Austrian astronomers
Bohemian nobility
People from Horšovský Týn
German Bohemian people
1781 births
1840 deaths
Edlers of Austria